Mathilde Froustey (born June 8, 1985, in Bordeaux, France) is a French ballet dancer.

She is a principal dancer at San Francisco Ballet. Mathilde Froustey was a "Sujet" soloist of the Paris Opera Ballet until 2013.

Early life
Mathilde Froustey started dancing in 1994, at the age of nine, in Dax in the south of France, because ballet training was helpful for her back problems. Later, in 1998, she trained at the Marseille National School of Ballet. Colette Armand, her ballet teacher in Marseille, recommended she audition for the prestigious Paris Opera Ballet School.

Paris Opera Ballet
Mathilde Froustey started at Paris Opera Ballet School in 1999 and joined Paris Opera Ballet in 2002. She was promoted to the rank of "Coryphée" in 2003.

In 2004, she won the gold medal at the Varna International Ballet Competition with Josua Hoffalt. In 2005, Froustey was promoted to "Sujet", soloist.

Froustey was one of the founding members of 3e étage, an independent group of Paris Opera Ballet dancers directed by Samuel Murez.

She toured in Japan with Manuel Legris as a member of his group Manuel Legris & Friends. Legris was at the time principal dancer ("danseur étoile") of the Paris Opera Ballet.

Becoming a principal dancer

Although Froustey appeared on stage in leading roles with the Paris Opera Ballet as of 2006, particularly as Kitri in Don Quixote, she was not promoted to "Première Danseuse", first soloist, with this company. Artistic director, Brigitte Lefèvre, could not explain why the jury consistently didn’t vote for her. Some ventured that her style was too extroverted and virtuosic for Paris, where restraint and purity are valued.

During her career, Froustey met artistic directors of prestigious ballet companies on several occasions when the directors were in the audience of ballet performances. She was on particularly good terms with Helgi Tómasson and Manuel Legris, who both appreciated her as a soloist.

After he had seen her dancing as Lise in La Fille mal gardée in Paris in July 2012, Manuel Legris offered her a position in the Vienna State Ballet as principal dancer, telling her at the same time to stay the Paris Opera Ballet a little bit more. Mathilde Froustey didn't wait too long.

She was the first top-notch dancer leaving the Paris Opera Ballet for years.

San Francisco Ballet
In January 2013, Mathilde Froustey accepted an offer from Helgi Tómasson, to become a principal dancer with the San Francisco Ballet.

Mathilde Froustey and Helgi Tómasson met each other already in 2006 at a competition in Paris through José Martinez, danseur étoile of the Paris Opera Ballet.

When she made a long-distance call inquiring about a job there, a contract arrived in the mail a week later. This was the first time that a principal dancer entered the San Francisco Ballet by bypassing the audition process.

On Stage
Kitri in Don Quixote is Mathilde Froustey's dream role. She was appreciated for her interpretation of Lise in La Fille Mal Gardée. "Froustey was the Lise that dreams are made of." "The queen of the night, undeniably Mathilde Froustey, is however not any longer in the stage of a young soloist making her debut. Her Lise is a whirlwind of good mood, spiced with a refined technique which lets her fly away in each variation." In the 2014 repertory season, her first repertory season with the San Francisco ballet, she performed the title role in Giselle a role she learned in ten days. Mathilde Froustey  considers Giselle as one of her favourite roles. Giselle with Mathilde Froustey was in the programming of the 2015 repertory season as well.

Awards
 2004: Varna International Ballet Competition, gold medal with Josua Hoffalt
 2007: Ballet2000 dance prize
 2013: Danza & Danza's best foreign dancer award
 2015: Isadora Duncan Dance Award for her performances of Giselle with Tiit Helimets
 2018: Nominated to the Isadora Duncan Dance Award for her performance in Sleeping Beauty (Aurora)

Repertoire

 Kitri in Don Quixote:
 Lise in La Fille Mal Gardée
 Anastasia in "Ivan the Terrible"
 Giselle in Giselle 
 Nutcracker (Grand Pas de Deux Ballerina and Sugar Plum Fairy)
 Romeo and Juliet (Juliet)
 Swan Lake (Odette/Odile)

 7 for Eight
 Caprice
 The Fifth Season
 Prism, and Trio
 Tomasson/Possokhov's Don Quixote (Kitri)
 Cranko's Onegin (Tatiana)
 Balanchine's Allegro Brillante, Brahms-Schoenberg Quartet, Rubies, Serenade, and Theme and Variations

 Gsovsky's Grand Pas Classique
 Lifar's Suite en Blanc
 Makarova's (after Petipa) “The Kingdom of the Shades” from La Bayadère, Act II (1st Solo Shade)
 Ratmansky's From Foreign Lands, Seven Sonatas, Shostakovich Trilogy, and Souvenir d’un lieu cher
 Robbins’ Dances at a Gathering (Yellow and Purple) and In the Night
 Wheeldon's Within the Golden Hour.

See also
 Paris Opera Ballet

References

External links
 Profile Mathilde Froustey, site of the San Francisco Ballet
 Five minutes With ... Mathilde Froustey, site of the San Francisco Ballet
 Mathilde Froustey: from France to S.F. Ballet, with panache, 5 July 2014
 Interview with Mathilde Froustey, the new SFB Principal, 25 June 2013
 Time to Shine, profile of Mathilde Froustey, 28 March 2014, Pointe

1985 births
Paris Opera Ballet dancers
Living people
San Francisco Ballet principal dancers
French ballerinas